Federal Fugitives (a.k.a. International Spy) is a 1941 American film noir directed by William Beaudine. The film stars Neil Hamilton, Doris Day, Victor Varconi, and Charles C. Wilson.

Plot
Government agent Captain James Madison (Neil Hamilton) spots a man in Washington D.C. that he thinks is Otto Lieberman (Victor Varconi), a fugitive that caused an aircraft crash that killed eight people. Without Lieberman's knowledge, Madison manages to identify him by his fingerprints on a water glass. He then learns his address after having his regular cab driver, Chuck (Lyle Latell), follow him. Lieberman has now assumed the identity of Dr. Frederic Haskell and is working with Bruce Lane (Charles C. Wilson), a wealthy lobbyist suspected of dealing with foreign agents.

The two men embark on a scheme to gain control of the aircraft plant owned by Henry Gregory (George M. Carleton). Gregory has invented a casting-process that uses plastic for some of the parts in an aircraft. Learning that Lieberman and Lane have met with Gregory, Madison also meets him and asks that he be introduced to them as Robert Edmunds, Gregory's partner in Los Angeles.

Lane's assistant Rita Bennett (Doris Day), is caught up in the scheme, but is falling for the government agent. Rita is afraid that Edmunds is going to be poisoned, but before she can warn him, she is struck down by a speeding car. After days in the hospital, she tries to carry out the warning, but the government agent is now at Haskell's hideout and about to take a poison pill. With Chuck and his friend Ox (Frank Moran), Rita takes them to the hideout. They subdue the foreign agents while Madison pursues Haskell, who falls down an elevator shaft to his death. Finally, Rita and Madison embrace and kiss.

Cast

 Neil Hamilton as Capt. James Madison/Robert Edmunds
 Doris Day as Rita Bennett
 Victor Varconi as Otto Lieberman a.k.a. Dr. Frederic Haskell
 Charles C. Wilson as Bruce Lane (as Charles Wilson)
 George M. Carleton as Henry Gregory
 Frank Shannon as Col. Hammond
 Betty Blythe as Marcia, Lane's sister
 Lyle Latell as Chuck
 Frank Moran as Ox, Chuck's Pal

Production
Principal photography for Federal Fugitives under the working title of International Spy took place in two weeks from mid-February 1941. After a stint in Great Britain, director William "One Shot" Beaudine returned to America in 1937 but had trouble re-establishing himself at the major studios.

After working at Warner Brothers, Beaudine found work on Poverty Row, working for studios specializing in low-budget films, such as Monogram Pictures and Producers Releasing Corporation. Beaudine became a specialist in comedies, thrillers and melodramas making dozens for these studios. By the 1940s, Beaudine had a reputation for being a resourceful, no-nonsense director who could make feature films in a matter of days, sometimes as few as five.

Typical of the low-budget spy genre of the period that often linked together latest aviation technology, Federal Fugitives did not have the benefit of on-location or studio sound stage scenes to create an aviation milieu. The aircraft being depicted is the top-secret Bell P-39 Airacobra in a scale model form.

Reception
Shortly after release, Federal Fugitives was followed up by Emergency Landing, another B film. Although only notable as one of a group of 1941 low-budget action films revolving around military aviation, the film was soon eclipsed by real-life events.

References

Notes

Citations

Bibliography

 Marshall, Wendy L. William Beaudine: From Silents to Television. Lanham, Maryland: Scarecrow Press, 2005. .
 Pendo, Stephen. Aviation in the Cinema. Lanham, Maryland: Scarecrow Press, 1985. .

External links
 
 
 

1941 films
1941 crime films
American aviation films
American crime films
American black-and-white films
Films directed by William Beaudine
Producers Releasing Corporation films
1940s American films